Russell K. Paul (born June 23, 1952) is an American politician serving as the mayor of Sandy Springs, Georgia since 2014.

Early life and education 
Paul was born in 1952, and grew up in the Birmingham, Alabama area. He received a Bachelor’s degree at Samford University and attended graduate school at Georgia State University.

Career 
Paul was the Stone Mountain city council member from 1977 to 1983. From1989 to 1993, he served as Assistant Secretary for Congressional and Intergovernmental Relations for the Housing and Urban Development Department under Secretary Jack Kemp. He chaired the Georgia Republican Party from 1995 to 1999, and became a State Senator representing northern Fulton County from 2001 to 2003. In 2005, he was elected to Sandy Springs city council. Paul was elected to succeed Eva Galambos in November 2013.

Personal life 
Paul is married to Jan Paul and has 5 children. He is an Episcopalian.

Controversies 
Paul has courted controversy for his lobbying work in relation to the Development Authority of Fulton County while serving as a publicly elected official.

References

External links
 Rusty Paul interview on Fox News
 Rusty Paul State of the City address March 2015

Mayors of places in Georgia (U.S. state)
Georgia (U.S. state) city council members
Republican Party Georgia (U.S. state) state senators
Politicians from Birmingham, Alabama
People from Sandy Springs, Georgia
People from Stone Mountain, Georgia
Living people
21st-century American politicians
1952 births